Penkiv is a village in Rivne Raion, Rivne Oblast, Ukraine, but was formerly administered within Kostopil Raion. As of the year 2001, the community had 292 residents. Postal code: 35020.

References 

Villages in Rivne Raion